McBride is a village in Montcalm County in the U.S. state of Michigan. The population was 205 at the 2010 census. The village is located within Day Township. The post office for the village, with ZIP code 48852, is named "McBrides" and provides P.O. Box service to the village.

History
The village is named for Alexander B McBride, a settler from Wayne County, New York, who built a sawmill there in 1874. A railroad station was named "McBride's Mill", while the post office named "McBrides" opened on March 26, 1878 with McBride as the first postmaster. The village was platted by D. L. Jacobs in 1877. An adjacent settlement was platted with the name "Custer" by Phipps Wado on April 2, 1878, but it became a part of McBride when that village was incorporated in 1883.

Geography

Demographics

2010 census
As of the census of 2010, there were 205 people, 83 households, and 52 families residing in the village. The racial makeup of the village was 98.0% White, 0.5% Asian, and 1.5% from two or more races. Hispanic or Latino of any race were 1.0% of the population.

There were 83 households, of which 32.5% had children under the age of 18 living with them, 49.4% were married couples living together, 9.6% had a female householder with no husband present, 3.6% had a male householder with no wife present, and 37.3% were non-families. 33.7% of all households were made up of individuals, and 14.4% had someone living alone who was 65 years of age or older. The average household size was 2.47 and the average family size was 3.02.

The median age in the village was 39.4 years. 28.8% of residents were under the age of 18; 8.4% were between the ages of 18 and 24; 23% were from 25 to 44; 24.9% were from 45 to 64; and 15.1% were 65 years of age or older. The gender makeup of the village was 50.7% male and 49.3% female.

2000 census
As of the census of 2000, there were 232 people, 86 households, and 63 families residing in the village. The racial makeup of the village was 98.71% White, 0.43% Native American, and 0.86% from two or more races.

There were 86 households, out of which 37.2% had children under the age of 18 living with them, 58.1% were married couples living together, 11.6% had a female householder with no husband present, and 26.7% were non-families. 24.4% of all households were made up of individuals, and 11.6% had someone living alone who was 65 years of age or older.  The average household size was 2.70 and the average family size was 3.11.

In the village, the population was spread out, with 25.0% under the age of 18, 9.9% from 18 to 24, 30.2% from 25 to 44, 20.7% from 45 to 64, and 14.2% who were 65 years of age or older.  The median age was 34 years. For every 100 females, there were 87.1 males.  For every 100 females age 18 and over, there were 83.2 males.

The median income for a household in the village was $30,568, and the median income for a family was $30,694. Males had a median income of $25,000 versus $18,214 for females. The per capita income for the village was $13,376.  About 8.2% of families and 18.8% of the population were below the poverty line, including 18.3% of those under the age of eighteen and 28.0% of those 65 or over.

References

Villages in Montcalm County, Michigan
Villages in Michigan